Whole brain radiotherapy (WBRT) is a palliative option for patients with brain metastases that alleviates symptoms, decreases the use of corticosteroids needed to control tumor-associated edema, and potentially improves overall survival.

Usage 
Whole brain radiotherapy (WBRT) has been reported to increase the risk of cognitive decline.

WBRT is sometimes used along with stereotactic radiosurgery (SRS) or surgery, and while these can improve survival for some patients with single brain metastasis, a 2021 systematic review of the literature found inconsistent results for overall survival.

References

Chemotherapy